Tahmasb Quli is a Turkic-derived Muslim male given name built from quli.

Tahmasb Quli Khan (the future Nadir Shah)
Tahmasp Qoli Khan

See also
 Tahmasb Qoli
Turkic masculine given names